The Geintizinacea comprises a superfamily of Upper Devonian to Upper Permian uniserial fusulinids (microgranular foraminifera with chambers aligned in a single row), the chamber walls consisting of a dark microgranular inner layer and  radially fibrous outer layer.  Advanced forms show secondary lateral thickening

The Geinitzinacea differs from the Nodosinellacea in that in the Nodosinellacea the inner layer is fibrous.

Two families are included, the Geinitzinidae and Pachyphloiidae.

References

 Alfred R. Loeblich Jr and Helen Tappan,1988. Forminiferal Genera and their Classification. Van Nostrand Reinhold.

Foraminifera superfamilies